The Social Christian Party was a political party founded and led by the Italian philosopher and librarian of the Vatican Library Gerardo Bruni.

History
Born at the beginning as a movement of Christians during the Resistance, partisans participated with other groups in their initial meetings to help form Christian Democracy. The founder, however, occurred an irremediable conflict between Bruni and other groups and Christian Democrats, who he felt were too moderate and supportive of capitalism, and they separated. The movement was transformed into a party for elections for the Constituent Assembly on June 2, 1946. The party supported the establishment of a Republic, used its own symbol (formed by a book and a shovel over a cross), collected 51,088 votes - the equivalent of 0.22% nationally - and elected a representative, Gerard Bruni.

The manifesto of 1946 outlined the party's politics as those of Christian socialism, putting stakes very clear and stressing their absolute autonomy, even in the context of the wider left:

The choice of autonomy from the other left parties, particularly with respect to Italian Communist Party (PCI) distinguished the Social Christian Party from the Party of the Christian Left of Franco Rodano which merged in the PCI since 1945. Bruni at the Constituent Assembly, inter alia, like Nenni and unlike Togliatti, was against the inclusion of the Concordat in the Constitution and voted against. The party stood in the elections of 1948 siding with the left, but refusing to enter the lists of the Popular Democratic Front. With the little strength which was available and the ostracism of the Church (Bruni in 1947 lost his job in the Vatican Library for his political positions), the party picked up 72,854 votes, 0.28% of the total vote, but no seats in parliament. Following this defeat, the party broke up and the founder Bruni continued his activities in certain movements of the Christian Left and independent socialist groups (including the 1953-57 experience of the Independent Socialist).

Election results

Chamber of Deputies

Notes
 In 1948, for the Senate the PSC run under the Socialist Unity.

Books
Antonio Parisella, Gerardo Bruni e i cristiano-sociali, Edizioni Lavoro, Rome 1984 (in Italian).

1943 establishments in Italy
1948 disestablishments in Italy
Catholicism and far-left politics
Catholic social teaching
Christian political parties
Catholic political parties
Christian socialist organizations
Defunct political parties in Italy
Political parties disestablished in 1948
Political parties established in 1943